The 2020–21 Hong Kong Third Division League was the 7th season of Hong Kong Third Division since it became the fourth-tier football league in Hong Kong in 2014–15.

Effects of the COVID-19 pandemic
Due to the forced cancellation of the 2019–20 season, there were no teams relegated into the Third Division this season.

League table

References

Hong Kong Third Division League seasons
2020–21 in Hong Kong football